The Heath River, which runs from the Andes surrounding Lake Titicaca northwards to the Madre de Dios River, marks the natural border between Peru and Bolivia.

The Eja Sonene indigenous community lives in the area. They are an ethnic group belonging to either the Tacana-speaking Arawak, who migrated from the west or those of Pano origin, who originate from the lower reaches of the Madeira River.

Named for the American explorer Dr Edwin R. Heath in the 1880s, the river borders lowland savannah and rainforest.  An early expedition to explore the Heath River basin was led by the British explorer Colonel Percy Harrison Fawcett in 1910.

References

External links
Map of Heath River and Tambopata area

Rivers of Peru
Rivers of La Paz Department (Bolivia)
Bolivia–Peru border
International rivers of South America
Rivers of Madre de Dios Region